Pelican Rapids is a community in the Canadian province of Manitoba. The Shoal River 65A Indian Reserve is adjacent to the community and is home to some members of the Sapotaweyak Cree Nation.

Demographics 

References 

 Government of Manitoba - Pelican Rapids

Designated places in Manitoba
Northern communities in Manitoba